Michael Kohlmann and Alexander Waske didn't defend their title.
Kohlmann participated with Horia Tecău, but lost to Philipp Marx and Igor Zelenay in the semifinals.
Rohan Bopanna and Aisam-ul-Haq Qureshi defeated Marx and Zelenay 6–4, 7–6(6) in the final.

Seeds

Draw

Draw

References
 Doubles Draw

Lambertz Open by STAWAG - Doubles
Lambertz Open by STAWAG